Gewilib (died 758 in Sponsheim, also Gewiliobus, Gewilip, Wieliebus) was a bishop of the Roman Catholic Diocese of Mainz. He was the son of Geroldus of Mainz and his successor as a bishop. He was deposed by Saint Boniface in 745, who succeeded him.

Bishops of Mainz (to 745)
758 deaths
Year of birth unknown
Date of death missing